Ye Qiuyu (born 29 November 1997) is an inactive Chinese tennis player.

Ye has won nine doubles titles on the ITF Women's Circuit in her career. On 30 April 2018, she reached her best singles ranking of world No. 480. On 20 November 2017, she peaked at No. 95 in the doubles rankings.

Ye made her WTA Tour main-draw debut at the 2014 Shenzhen Open, partnering Yang Zhaoxuan in doubles. The pair lost their first round match against third seeds Irina Buryachok and Oksana Kalashnikova.

WTA 125 tournament finals

Doubles: 1 (runner-up)

ITF Circuit finals

Singles: 2 (0–2)

Doubles: 15 (9–6)

Junior Grand Slam finals

Girls' doubles (0–0)

References

External links
 
 

1997 births
Living people
Chinese female tennis players
Wimbledon junior champions
Grand Slam (tennis) champions in girls' doubles
Tennis players at the 2014 Summer Youth Olympics
People from Huzhou
Tennis players from Zhejiang
Universiade medalists in tennis
Universiade gold medalists for China
Universiade bronze medalists for China
Medalists at the 2019 Summer Universiade
21st-century Chinese women